Matt's Monsters is an animated series broadcast by Disney Channel and Disney XD, and formerly on Jetix. Matt's Monsters debuted in May 23, 2008 in France, and in other countries in June 1, 2009.  The series follows a nine-year-old boy named Matt, who is ready for action as he enlists his dad, his neighbor Manson and his pet monster Dink to run a monster agency as they hunt down for monsters of all shapes, sizes and forms and save the city of Joliville.

Characters

 Matt Average: He is a nine-year-old kid who, along with his dad, his pet monster Dink and his neighbor Manson run a monster agency. He is a boy with a large head, a white T-shirt, a red belt and blue pants. Despite his young age, he pretty smart and resourceful when it comes to monster hunting. Matt also has three tiny monsters he keeps as pets.
 Manson: She is the neighbor of Matt, a stoic girl with a Gothic appearance who loves everything related to monsters. She is mostly seen wearing a dark green, long sleeved shirt, a brown skirt and grey combat boots. She has long black hair that is tied into low pigtails, is quite pale, and has eyes that match the color of her shirt. A running gag in the series is that Matt's father is constantly mistaking her for a boy, despite her appearance not being boyish at all.
 Bruce Average: He is the enthusiast father of Matt and the neighbor of Manson. He is the owner of the Monster Agency.
 Ellen Average: She is the mother of Matt and the neighbor of Manson. It is very rare that she will tag along on mission, but sometimes she has to save the day.
 Dink: Matt's pet and a good monster. He speaks in its own language that only Matt can understand. He can fire electrical discharges from the horns on his head.
 The Mini-Monsters: Are small and good monsters who Matt keeps as pets. One of the Mini-Monsters is a greenish-brown sludge monster with only one eye, called Mika. The second Mini-Monster is a light purple creature with a cat-like head and the lower body of a squid, called Uxi. The third Mini-Monster is a small, golden colored dragon with glasses and small burgundy wings, called Sid.
 The Mayor: The mayor of the city. He is responsible for giving the missions to Matt, Manson, Bruce and Dink.
 Sheriff: One of the most important agents in the city.
 Madame Bovary: A lady with supposed supernatural powers, along with her accomplice Appendix, who also hunts monsters. Her company is known as "the Company Bovary". She is the business rival of Matt and his father. Her name is taken from Madame Bovary, although her character in general is roughly based in Madame Blavatsky.
 Appendix: Madame Bovary's henchman, a meek mad scientist. Half of his cranium is replaced with a metal piece.
 Sonia: A Hindi girl, classmate of Matt. He has a large crush on her.
 Socrates: A bully from Matt's class.

Broadcast
Matt's Monsters debuted in 2008 in France, and in 2009 in other countries. The series was broadcast on the Starz Kids & Family cable network for the United States from 2012 to 2014.

References

External links
 
 Series profile at Gaumont Animation.

2000s French animated television series
Dutch children's animated comedy television series
Dutch children's animated fantasy television series
French children's animated action television series
French children's animated comedy television series
French children's animated fantasy television series
French children's animated horror television series
Italian children's animated action television series
Italian children's animated comedy television series
Italian children's animated fantasy television series
French-language television shows
Gaumont Animation
Animated television series about children